Murphy's Law is a 1986 American neo-noir action thriller film directed by J. Lee Thompson from a screenplay by Gail Morgan Hickman. It was released by Cannon Films to the United States on April 18, 1986. The film stars Charles Bronson and Kathleen Wilhoite in lead roles with a supporting cast that includes Carrie Snodgress, Robert F. Lyons, and Richard Romanus. The film marks the sixth collaboration between Bronson and director J. Lee Thompson (following 1976's St. Ives, 1977's The White Buffalo, 1980's Caboblanco, 1983's 10 to Midnight, and 1984's The Evil That Men Do).

Plot

Jack Murphy (Bronson), a hardened, antisocial alcoholic LAPD detective, frequently escapes the harsh reality that his ex-wife (Angel Tompkins) has become a stripper and his career is going nowhere by drinking. His world is turned upside down, however, when he is framed by ex-convict Joan Freeman (Carrie Snodgress) for putting her in prison earlier in his career.

Freeman murders the detective's ex-wife and her boyfriend and begins killing off his associates while framing him for the crimes. The same police force he works for places him under arrest with Arabella McGee (Kathleen Wilhoite), a foul-mouthed petty thief he locked away. Murphy escapes from jail while still handcuffed to McGee and they pursue the real killer. While in pursuit of Freeman, who has managed to kill all of those on her hit list save Murphy, Arabella is kidnapped by Freeman and taken to the building where she was first arrested by Murphy. Murphy calls for reinforcement and is met with skepticism. Murphy heads off to rescue Arabella, in the building he is stalked by Freeman who is armed with a crossbow. Meanwhile, Arabella is bound and gagged at the bottom of an elevator shaft. The cop following Murphy arrives and draws his gun on Murphy and reveals that he is working for a mob boss named Vincenzo, whose brother was killed by Murphy. Freeman quickly dispatches the cop with an arrow. Vincenzo tires of waiting and he and his two bodyguards enter the building, posing another threat to Murphy. Murphy easily dispatches the bodyguards before goading Vincenzo into trying to kill him. Vincenzo attacks Murphy but Murphy shoots him dead. Freeman sends the elevator down in an attempt to kill Arabella. Murphy saves her in the nick of time. But Freeman fires an arrow into Arabella's back, goading Murphy into a confrontation. She attacks Murphy with an axe and he knocks her over the railing of the staircase on the top floor. She manages to take hold of the axe which is wedged in the railing. She tries to get Murphy to help her. He stands and watches as she begins to slip. She yells at him to go to hell, he responds ladies first. With that she slips and falls to her death. Murphy is loaded into the back of an ambulance with a still alive Arabella, and they are taken to the hospital.

Cast

Production
The film was photographed by Alex Phillips Jr.

Music
Murphy's Law includes music by Marc Donahue and Valentine McCallum.

Reception

Critical response
Variety gave a mixed review of Murphy's Law, referring to the film as a "very violent urban crime meller, is tiresome but too filled with extreme incident to be boring." The New York Times described the film's plot as "flimsy" and noted that "it seems we're meant to be drawn into this nonexistent story. Yet there's nothing, not even the obligatory injustice done to Jack Murphy, that gives the movie even the pretense of emotional power or intrigue."

Online film database Allmovie gave the film one and a half stars out of five, describing it as an "often silly but fitfully amusing potboiler [that] is one of the better Charles Bronson vehicles from his 1980s era."

External sources
 Murphy's Law at the MGM Movie Database

References

External links 
 
 
 

1986 films
1986 action thriller films
American action thriller films
American police detective films
Films directed by J. Lee Thompson
Films set in Los Angeles
Golan-Globus films
American neo-noir films
Films with screenplays by Gail Morgan Hickman
Fictional portrayals of the Los Angeles Police Department
1980s English-language films
1980s American films